"Dance Dance" is the fifth and final single by British dance duo Booty Luv from their debut album Boogie 2Nite. It is the second original single release from the duo, with songwriting credits from both group members, Nadia and Cherise. It was released in the Netherlands on 11 November 2008, but was  not released in the United Kingdom.

Track listing 
CD
 "Dance Dance" — 3:07
 "Dance Dance" (Hardwell Remix) — 7:07
 "Booty Luv Megamix" — 4:44

Charts 

The single was a club hit on the Netherlands, where peaked at number 5 on the Club Chart, and at number 27 on the Singles Chart.

References 

Booty Luv songs
Eurodance songs
2007 songs
Songs written by Carl Ryden
2008 singles
Songs about dancing